The Barbarians Move In is the second album by Duels. It was released for digital download on 14 February 2008 followed by a physical release in April 2008 on This Is Fake DIY Records. It was produced, engineered and mixed by the band themselves.

Track listing
"The Furies"
"Sleeping Giants"
"Regeneration"
"Perimeter Fence"
"The Healing"
"Wolvesland"
"The Wild Hunt"
"This Year's Man"
"Forgotten Babies"
"The First Time/The Last Time"
"The Barbarians Move In"

Singles
 "Regeneration" (April 2008)

References

Duels (band) albums
2008 albums